Bądkowo may refer to the following places:
Bądkowo, Kuyavian-Pomeranian Voivodeship (north-central Poland)
Bądkowo, Masovian Voivodeship (east-central Poland)
Bądkowo, West Pomeranian Voivodeship (north-west Poland)